The 2016 Kremlin Cup was a professional pool tournament in the discipline Ten-ball, held from 9–12 November 2016 in Olympic Stadium in Moscow, Russia.

The winner was Alexander Kazakis, who defeated Thorsten Hohmann 9–6 in the final. Dsmitryj Tschuprou and Ralf Souquet took third place. Ruslan Chinachov, the winner of the previous two years, was eliminated in the quarter-final against Kazakis.

Tournament format 
The event featured 101 participants competing first in a Double-elimination tournament. When there are 32 players remaining, the tournament progressed to a single-elimination tournament. The event was played as winner breaks.

Prize money

Results
Below is the single elimination round from the last 32 stage onwards.

References

External links

2016 in cue sports
Kremlin Cup (pool)